Nemesis Games is a 2015 science fiction novel by James S. A. Corey, the pen name of Daniel Abraham and Ty Franck, and the fifth book in their The Expanse series. It is the sequel to Cibola Burn. The cover art is by Daniel Dociu.
Nemesis Games received positive reviews. Andrew Liptak of io9 called the novel "Corey’s 'Empire Strikes Back'".

Plot summary
The Rocinante is down for long-term maintenance after the events of Cibola Burn. Three crew members decide to take care of some personal business during the down time. Amos Burton heads to Earth when he learns someone important from his past there has died, to pay his respects and to make sure no foul play was involved. Alex Kamal heads to Mars in the hopes of getting closure with his ex-wife and to see Bobbie while there. Naomi Nagata heads to Ceres station, when she receives a message that her son Filip is in trouble. While Jim Holden supervises repairs to the Rocinante, he is enlisted by Monica Stuart to investigate disappearing colony ships.

Facing collapse by the exodus of colony ships through the rings, militant factions of the OPA coalesce into a Free Navy and simultaneously wreak havoc on Earth by dropping asteroids onto the surface, and subsequently attempting to kill the Martian Prime Minister and Fred Johnson. Amos survives the attacks on Earth, frees Clarissa Mao and escapes to Luna with her help and the help of Baltimore organized crime acquaintances from his old life. Alex meets Bobbie on Mars and they investigate missing Martian military equipment and ships, which leads them into the middle of the assassination attempt on the Prime Minister. Naomi is kidnapped by her ex-lover Marco, leader of the Free Navy, but manages to escape; Alex and Bobbie rescue her.

The crew reunites on the Rocinante. What's left of the Earth, Mars and the non-militant OPA government meet on Luna. Naomi finally tells Jim about her violent past. Amos asks that Clarissa stay as his apprentice. The Free Navy has encamped past the belt and is preventing anyone from going through the rings. It is revealed that the Free Navy was sold most of its equipment by a rogue faction of the Martian Navy led by Admiral Winston Duarte and that the disappearing colony ships are being consumed by a force within the gates.

References

External links
 
 The series' web site 

The Expanse
2015 American novels
American science fiction novels
Space opera novels
Novels set on Mars
Novels by James S. A. Corey
Orbit Books books